El Dorado Adventist School is a non-profit, WASC accredited, coeducational K-8 school owned and operated by local church constituencies and the Northern California Conference of Seventh-day Adventists. It is a part of the Seventh-day Adventist education system, the world's second largest Christian school system. It is in the Sierra foothill community of Placerville, California, United States.

Established in 1913 as the Wide Awake School, serving 14 elementary students, the school moved to its present location in 1936 and became the Camino-Placerville Junior Academy, teaching grades K-10.  The school later became El Dorado Junior Academy and existed as a K-10 program until 1996 when a decision was made to become a full K-12 school.  The school became El Dorado Adventist School, and from 1996 to 2003, the high school program existed as an extension school of Rio Lindo Adventist Academy in Healdsburg.  In the fall of 2003, the North American Division of Seventh-day Adventists gave El Dorado Adventist School the authorization to become a stand-alone, fully functioning K-12 institution, and in June 2004, the school celebrated its first official graduates.

The Placerville and Camino Seventh-day Adventist Churches own El Dorado Adventist School in conjunction with the Northern California Conference, which supports and coordinates the efforts of 47 schools and over 3800 students.  The Placerville Church has a membership of 757 and the Camino Church has a membership of 255.  The pastors of the two churches are heavily involved in the school program of El Dorado Adventist School by serving on the school board, giving weekly worships and leading out in spiritual activities involving EAS students.

Service opportunities 
Students are required to participate in 25 hours per year of community service activities (100 hours in order to graduate). The programs range from mission trips to locations such as Peru, Costa Rica, and the Dominican Republic, volunteer service at the Upper Room Dining Hall (a soup kitchen located down the road from the school), service days hosted by the faculty and staff at EAS, manual labor activities designed to beautify and improve the area around both EAS and the larger community, setting up a homeless shelter for the weekend, and other community activities.

Some of the students have participated in El Dorado County Teen Court, a program that allows young people to be involved in the judicial process in the county and act as lawyers, bailiffs, and jury members in a real court setting. Other students have been involved with the El Dorado County Youth Commission, a group of various students from the public and private high school in the area who work with the Board of Supervisors in the county to create change for the youth. Many of the high school students have attended Youth With A Mission (YWAM) in San Francisco, a weekend program designed to put students in touch with the homeless there and to minister by serving them food and talking with them.

Spiritual aspects
All students take religion classes each year. These classes cover topics in biblical history and Christian and denominational doctrines. Instructors in other disciplines also begin each class period with prayer or a short devotional thought, many of which encourage student input. The entire student body gathers together weekly in the auditorium for an hour-long chapel service.
Outside the classrooms there is year-round spiritually oriented programming that relies on student involvement.

Athletics
The Academy offers the following sports:
Basketball (boys' and girls')
Football (boys' and girls')
Volleyball (boys' and girls')

See also

 List of Seventh-day Adventist secondary schools
 Seventh-day Adventist education

References

High schools in El Dorado County, California
Adventist secondary schools in the United States
Private high schools in California
Private middle schools in California
Private elementary schools in California
1913 establishments in California